Lassi Yrjölä (born July 31, 1994) is a Finnish ice hockey goaltender. He is currently playing with Corsaires de Dunkerque of the FFHG Division 1 in France.

Yrjölä made his Liiga debut playing with Ilves during the 2014–15 Liiga season where he played two games. He joined the Chicago Steel of the United States Hockey League (USHL) on 31 December 2014, but returned to Europe for the following season.

References

External links

1994 births
Living people
Ice hockey people from Tampere
Chicago Steel players
Corsaires de Dunkerque players
Finnish ice hockey goaltenders
Ilves players
Kiekko-Vantaa players
KOOVEE players
Lempäälän Kisa players
Peliitat Heinola players
SaPKo players